Stephen Ruzich (December 24, 1927 – November 30, 1991) was a guard in the National Football League. He was drafted in the fourteenth round of the 1952 NFL Draft by the Cleveland Browns and later played three seasons with the Green Bay Packers.

References

Players of American football from Cleveland
Green Bay Packers players
American football offensive guards
Ohio State Buckeyes football players
1927 births
1991 deaths